The 1904–05 Christian Brothers Cadets men's soccer team represented the Christian Brothers College High School (then known as college) during the 1904–05 college soccer season. The team, along with Haverford were declared co-champions by the Intercollegiate Soccer Football League. Additionally, the program was selected to participate as the local representative in the soccer tournament at the 1904 Summer Olympics in November. In the Olympics, the program earned the silver medal after losing to Canadian club, Galt, and defeating American club, St. Rose Parish. To date, they are the only college/high school soccer program to have ever earned an Olympic medal.

Squad 
The following players were known to have played for the university during the season.

Schedule 

|-
!colspan=6 style="background:#6B3FA0; color:#FFFFFF; border:2px solid #CFB53B;"| Summer Olympics
|-

References 

Christian Brothers Cadets
1904
1904
Christian Brothers Cadets
Christian Brothers Cadets